Andrew James Rowland (born 1 October 1965) is an English former footballer who played in the Football League for Torquay United. He came on as a substitute in Torquay's 1991 Play-off final win at Wembley.

References

1965 births
Living people
Sportspeople from Taunton
English footballers
Association football forwards
Torquay United F.C. players
Kiveton Park F.C. players
Exmouth Town F.C. players
Southampton F.C. players
Tiverton Town F.C. players
English Football League players